Channel [V] ("V" standing for the letter, not the Roman numeral "5") is a Chinese and former Asian pay television musical network originally launched by Star TV Hong Kong (now Fox Networks Group Asia Pacific). It was part of the unit of Disney International Operations, and was launched back in September 1991 to replace the first incarnation of MTV's Asian operation before it was shutdown on October 1, 2021.

The Mainland Chinese version is later owned by Star China Media, and is still operational, since they're a subsidiary of China Media Capital. The Australian channels were later owned by Foxtel before their closure.

Channel [V] previously operated either a local feed or a relay of the international version in Hong Kong, Macau, Southeast Asia, the Middle East, and Thailand or localized versions in India, the Philippines, Taiwan, South Korea, Japan and Australia.

History

Early years

MTV Asia (15 September 1991–2 May 1994)
Channel [V] was originally launched on 15 September 1991 as MTV Asia. It was an 24-hour music channel broadcast in English, Hindi and Chinese, focused on pop music. The STAR TV Network, which is based in British Hong Kong (now called Hong Kong, China since 1997), operated the channel in partnership with Viacom in the United States, which owned MTV-branded regional music channels there. The channel was broadcast across the continent of Asia, reaching from the Far East to the Middle East, as with the AsiaSat 1's footprint. The STAR TV Network have since regionalized the channel to serve its huge viewerships.

On 2 May 1994, MTV Asia left the STAR TV Network as a result of the contract with Viacom expired.

Channel [V] (27 May 1994–30 September 2021)
On 27 May 1994, Channel [V] was launched as a replacement of MTV Asia with VJs (who used to work on MTV Asia) celebrating on air from various locations; the Great Wall of China, the Taj Mahal, Downtown Tokyo, the Himalayas etc. At the same time, Channel [V] officially 'split' its beam, in effect, providing two separate services for different regional audiences within the AsiaSat 1's footprint. This enables the channel to provide appropriate programming and viewing time for its viewers from different regions in Asia.

On 5 June 1994, Channel [V] has opened up its production facilities in Taipei, Taiwan.

On 4 July 1994, Sigaw Manila was launched on the Northern Beam.

On 1 August 1994, BPL Oye! was launched on the Southern Beam.

On 5 June 1994, Channel [V] has opened up its production facilities in Mumbai (formerly known as Bombay), India.

On 27 April 1995, the STAR TV Network starts transmitting Channel [V] on the Palapa B2R satellite to Indonesia and the Philippines.

On 30 April 1995, Channel [V] has opened up its production facilities in Dubai, the United Arab Emirates producing Sony Yalla!, the first ever Arabic Top 10 Countdown in the Middle East was launched on the Southern Beam.

On 4 August 1996, a Thai-localized feed of Channel [V] was launched in Thailand, as carried on Thai cable and satellite providers. This apparently replaced Channel [V] International in the country, but the pan-Asian feed would still be available in Thailand via both AsiaSat and Palapa satellites.

In 1997, Channel [V] International was launched in the Middle East on the Middle Eastern digital satellite TV platform Orbit Communications Company as part of the STAR Select package.

On 15 July 1997, Channel [V] International was launched in Japan on the Japanese digital satellite TV platform SKY PerfecTV!.

On 27 April 2021, Disney announced that Channel [V] would be closing down on 1 October as part of its winddown of traditional cable/satellite networks across Southeast Asia and Hong Kong in favor of focusing on both Disney+ and Disney+ Hotstar, thus the channel space initially created by the first incarnation of MTV Asia in 1991 subsequently ceased to exist, while Channel [V] continues broadcasting in Mainland China as for now.

Operating channels

Current feeds
Mainland China

Channel [V] Mainland China is the Chinese branch of the Channel [V] network. It started operating in Mainland China in 1994 as part of Channel [V] Asia. Fox International Channels Asia Pacific sold certain Mandarin language entertainment television channels that target Mainland China, including Channel [V] Mainland China, to China Media Capital. As a result, Channel [V] Mainland China is a part of Star China Media as of 2014. It was broadcast free-to-air on AsiaSat 7. Channel [V] switches between Simplified and Traditional Chinese with selected Channel [V] International programs airing with Chinese subtitles.

Current VJs
 Blackie (黑人)
 Christine Fan (范范/范瑋琪)
 Will Pan (潘瑋柏)

Former feeds
Hong Kong, Macau, Southeast Asia, and International

Channel [V] Asia was the flagship of the Channel [V] network. It was founded after MTV Asia separated with the STAR TV Network after the expiration of its contract. It was produced and operated from Hong Kong from January 1994 until January 2002, after which operations and studios were shifted to Malaysia with some aspects still operating in Hong Kong. Since January 1, 2008, Channel [V] International has moved back to its original studio in Hong Kong, which is also the same studio of Channel [V] China and Taiwan.

After 27 years of broadcasting, Channel [V] along with most of The Walt Disney Company channels across Southeast Asia and Hong Kong (Fox Crime, Fox, Fox Life, FX, Disney Junior, Disney Channel, Nat Geo People, Fox Movies, Fox Action Movies, Fox Family Movies, Star Movies China, SCM Legend, and five of its sports channels) officially ceased broadcasting and transmission on October 1, 2021, at exactly midnight (based on Jakarta's time) with the final music video being M to the B by Millie B. In the Philippines, The channel space was now replaced by ViacomCBS's Nickelodeon on October 1, 2021 on G Sat and other cable providers while in the rest of South East Asian countries was now replaced by another channel from the content provider.

Former VJs

 Rick Tan
 Paula Malai Ali
 Cindy Burbridge
 Marion Caunter
 Angela Chow
 Trey Farley
 Alessandra
 Patrick Lima
 Amanda Griffin
 Danny McGill
 Sophiya Haque
 Cliff Ho
 Maya Karin
 Dania Khatib
 Dom Lau
 Francis Magalona
 Rishma Malik
 Joey Mead
 Melanie Casul
 Jonathan Putra
 Lisa S.
 Nicholas Saputra
 Jeremiah Odra
 Asha Gill
 Vivien Tan
 Kamal Sidhu
 Sarah Tan
 Ruth Winona Tao
 Brad Turvey
 Georgina Wilson
 David Wu

Thailand

Channel [V] Thailand was the Thai branch of the Channel [V] network. It is a joint venture between The Walt Disney Company Asia Pacific, GMM Media and TrueVisions. It started operating in Thailand in 1994 as part of Channel [V] Asia.

Channel [V] Thailand also officially ceased transmission on 1 October 2021.

Former VJs 
 B – Bandit Saokaew
 Boss –  Chatchavalit Sirisab
 Chai – Chartayodom Hiranyasthiti
 Earth – San Ittisuknanth
 Emme –  Amika Boohert
 Helen – Prathumrat Berger
 Jenny – Genevieve Jane Irwin
 Janeen – Janeen Lyons
 Loukade – Metinee Kingpayome
 Louk-Tarn – Supamat Phahulo
 Meaw – Autcharra Sinratchar-tarnon
 Nadia – Nadia Nimitvanich
 Sunny – Sunissa Brown
 Ta-Ngaew – Bussaba Mahatthapong
 Team – Kosin Piyakittiphaibun
 Terng –  Pradorn Sirakovit
 Michael – Sirachuch Chienthaworn
 Nax – Charlie Potjes
 Alex – Bin Alexandre
 Bank – Puttipong Kongsomsaksakul
 Bas – Panupat Sulanlayalak
 Ake – Eakachai Waricharaporn
 Ja – Natthaweeranuch Thongmee
 Kwan – Sirikwan Chinnachot
 Loukade – Jirada Yohara
 Mike – Michael Kenneth Wong
 Paula –   Paula Taylor
 Pitta – Pitta na Patalung
 Woonsen – Virithipa Pakdeeprasong

 India (1994–2018)

Channel [V] India was the Indian branch of the Channel [V] network. It was operated by Star India. It started operating in India in 1994 as part of Channel [V] Asia. On 1 July 2012, the channel discontinued its musical programming and started focusing on original content through fiction dailies and studio formats that address teenage issues.  On 30 June 2016, stopped airing original programming. On 1 August, it rebranded its graphical package. Later, it discontinued operations on 15 September 2018.

 Philippines (1994–2012)

Channel [V] Philippines was the Filipino branch of the Channel [V] network. It was a joint venture between Fox Networks Group Asia Pacific, Fox International Channels, Previous channel providers and partners like Ermita Electronics Corporation (Channel 23 where MTV Asia also air on the same channel as a first launch), CityNet (Channel 27, A GMA Network affiliate), TV Xtreme Broadcasting Company and Northern Star Productions. It started operating in the Philippines in 1994 as part of Channel [V] Asia. It discontinued operations on 13 July 2012.

 Taiwan (1994–2018)

Channel [V] Taiwan was the Taiwanese branch of the Channel [V] network. It started operating in Taiwan in 1994 as part of Channel [V] Asia. On 1 September 2012 it was replaced by Fox Taiwan (and later Star World Taiwan), while Channel [V] Taiwan still operated overseas. On 15 July 2018, Channel [V] Taiwan officially shut down.

 South Korea (1994–2008)

Channel [V] Korea was the Korean branch of the Channel [V] network. It started operating in South Korea in 1994 as part of Channel [V] Asia.

 Japan (1994–2002)

Channel [V] Japan was the Japanese branch of the Channel [V] network. It started operating in Japan in 1994 as part of Channel [V] Asia.

 Australia (1995–2020)

Channel [V] Australia was the Australian branch of the Channel [V] network. It was first launched as Red in 1995 and was owned by Foxtel. It ceased broadcasting in Australia on 26 February 2016, as it merged with [V] Hits (later rebranded as [V]), focusing only on music video programming and countdowns. V Hits was also formerly known as Club [V] and Channel [V] 2, and ceased broadcasting on July 1, 2020. Former VJs included Osher Günsberg (then "Andy G"), Jabba, James Mathison, Chloe Maxwell and Yumi Stynes.

Programming

See also
 MTV Asia
 MYX
 VH1
 Zing
 List of programmes broadcast by Channel V

References

Television stations in Thailand
Television networks in the Philippines
Television networks in South Korea
Television stations in Hong Kong
Television stations in Taiwan
Television stations in Malaysia
Television stations in Indonesia
Defunct television channels
Mass media in Southeast Asia
Television channels and stations established in 1991
Television channels and stations disestablished in 2021
English-language television stations
Music television channels
Former subsidiaries of The Walt Disney Company
1991 establishments in Hong Kong